A list of films produced in France in 1948.

See also
1948 in France

External links
 French films of 1948 at the Internet Movie Database
French films of 1948 at Cinema-francais.fr

1948
Films
French